The Baumann Skin Types system is a skin-type classification system defining 16 skin personalities. This classification system was developed in 2004 by University of Miami dermatology professor Leslie Baumann, to subdivide research participants into specific phenotypes. She assigns binary values to four characteristics, so defining sixteen "skin personalities", or "skin types". These have been used in genetic research aimed at identifying the genes that contribute to skin characteristics such as dryness, oiliness, aging, pigmentation, and sensitivity. The a survey-based typing system combines these individual skin attributes into 16 personalities that allow researchers to improve their ability to identify various skin phenotypes and use that knowledge for patient selection for clinical research trials and to recommend proper skincare ingredients and products. The classification system has been adopted by estheticians, dermatologists, consumers and retailers to match cosmeceutical ingredients and skin care products to specific skin types. The type assigned is determined by a self-completed questionnaire, marketed as the "Baumann Skin Type Indicator" (BSTI).

Parameters
The typing system identifies four key skin attributes (dry/oily, sensitive/resistant, pigmented/non-pigmented and wrinkle-prone/tight), represented as D/O, S/R, P/N, and W/T. Combining these results in 16 possible types. For example, one type is ORPW (oily, resistant, pigmented, wrinkle-prone) while another is DSPT (dry, sensitive, pigmented, tight). More than just combinations of skin attributes, each type experiences different dermatologic problems, which indicate preventative measures and treatment options.

Dry vs oily
One factor that determines whether skin is dry or oily is the amount of sebum produced by the skin. Sebum creates a fat-based film on the skin, which may also have an effect on skin hydration. The state of the skin’s stratum corneum plays a role in determining whether one is dry or oily as well, since this barrier layer also helps hold moisture in the skin.

Dry skin is often characterized by rough texture, dull color and tightness, especially after cleansing. Oily skin is characterized by increased sebum production, which often leads to acne. The level of sebaceous gland production of sebum, which contains wax esters, triglycerides, and squalene, may also contribute to dry skin and skin protection. Although diet, stress and hormones play a role in sebum production, there is a significant genetic link.

Sensitive vs resistant
The presence of inflammation is the major determining factor for sensitive or resistant skin. An impaired stratum corneum layer can lead to sensitive skin because this layer of the skin serves as a barrier to keep allergens and irritants out.

Sensitive skin often reacts to skincare products with redness, stinging, burning or acne, while resistant skin rarely experiences negative side effects. The strong stratum corneum associated with resistant skin can make the skin resistant to the beneficial effects of skincare ingredients due to less absorption.

There are 4 unique subtypes of sensitive skin, and they are all different, all sensitive subtypes have inflammation in common.
Acne subtype: Develops acne, whiteheads, or blackheads
Rosacea subtype: Experiences recurring flushing, redness, and a hot sensation
Stinging subtype: Develops stinging or burning of the skin
Allergic subtype: Develops redness, itching, and flaking of the skin

Pigmented vs non-pigmented
This skin attribute is measured by the skin’s tendency to develop unwanted pigment. This can be sun-induced, as in melasma, solar lentigos, and freckles, or due to injury in the form of post-inflammatory hyperpigmentation (PIH). Most pigment changes can be prevented and corrected through the use of proper skincare ingredients.

Wrinkle-prone vs tight
Age, ethnicity, and lifestyle habits influence whether skin is wrinkle-prone or tight. There is still a genetic component to this parameter, but external factors that contribute to an aged appearance are controllable. Sun exposure is the primary cause of skin aging, destroying skin proteins like collagen and elastin.

Combinations of skin types
Each parameter is associated with particular skin conditions and challenges, and the specific combinations also experience particular tendencies. For example, DRPW types often have a history of sun exposure manifested by wrinkles and solar lentigos; DSNT, DSPT, DSPW, and DSNW are more prone to eczema; OSNT and OSPT types are more likely to suffer from acne; and OSNW and DSNW types more commonly experience rosacea.

The "Baumann Skin Type Indicator" (BSTI) questionnaire is the definitive method to determine the type. It is recommended that the BSTI be repeated annually, since the type can change with age, pregnancy, menopause, climate conditions, diet, and lifestyle.

See also
Skincare

References

Skin care
Dermatologic terminology